Jack Falla is a Guernsey born British racing driver who has had multiple podiums in Carrera Cup Australia, Carrera Cup Great Britain and also compete in Blancpain Sprint Series as a Lamborghini Junior Driver.

Personal life and education 
Jack Falla was born on June 12, 1987 in Guernsey Channel Islands. Jack completed his education from University of Surrey. Jack is an investor of start-up businesses, including tech company's Kandi Cartel and Found Software. Verus Extracts, a cannabis distribution company and Raw Fitness are amongst other companies owned by Falla. He is the founder of FF Commercial Limited, a leading Facilities Management company based in Guernsey, Channel Islands. Jack's current net worth is estimated to be between £10 and £15 million.

References 

Living people
1985 births
British racing drivers
Racing drivers from Guernsey
Alumni of the University of Surrey